Juvonte Reddic (born May 23, 1992) is an American professional basketball player for Ironi Kiryat Ata of the Israeli Basketball Premier League. A 6' 9" power forward, Reddic played college basketball for Virginia Commonwealth University (VCU).

College career
Reddic chose VCU over Maryland, Ole Miss and Oklahoma out of Quality Education Academy in Winston-Salem, North Carolina.  As a freshman, Reddic was a role player, but did contribute to the Rams' run to the 2011 NCAA Final Four.  He moved into the starting lineup as a sophomore, averaging 10.3 points and 6.7 rebounds per game and earning third-team All-Colonial Athletic Association honors.

As a junior and senior, Reddic became one of the top big men in the Atlantic 10 Conference, earning second-team all-conference honors both seasons and earned national recognition in his senior season as he was one of 50 players nationally added to the John R. Wooden Award watch list for national player of the year.  Reddic finished with 1,438 points and 895 rebounds for his career.

Professional career

2014–15 season
Following the close of his college career, Reddic was not drafted in the 2014 NBA draft. On August 6, 2014, he signed with Victoria Libertas Pesaro of Italy for the 2014–15 season. In January 2015, he left Pesaro and signed with Virtus Pallacanestro Bologna for the rest of the season.

2015–16 season
In July 2015, Reddic joined the Brooklyn Nets for the 2015 NBA Summer League. On October 31, Reddic was selected by the Canton Charge in the third round of the 2015 NBA Development League draft.

2016–17 season
On August 22, 2016, Reddic signed with the Greek team Kolossos Rodou. He was voted as the Greek Basket League MVP of the 1st round.

2017–present
Reddic played for Falco KC Szombathely of the Hungarian League. In the 2019-20 season he averaged 15.4 points and 5.4 rebounds per game. On May 29, 2020, he signed with Chorale Roanne Basket of the LNB Pro A. Reddic averaged 12.3 points, 5.1 rebounds and 1.4 steals per game. He re-signed with the team on June 19, 2021.

In the summer of 2022, he signed with Ironi Kiryat Ata of the Israeli Basketball Premier League.

References

External links
 Italian League profile
 VCU Rams bio

1992 births
Living people
American expatriate basketball people in Belgium
American expatriate basketball people in Greece
American expatriate basketball people in Hungary
American expatriate basketball people in Italy
American men's basketball players
Basketball players from Winston-Salem, North Carolina
Belfius Mons-Hainaut players
Canton Charge players
Chorale Roanne Basket players
Falco KC Szombathely players
Ironi Kiryat Ata players
Kolossos Rodou B.C. players
Power forwards (basketball)
VCU Rams men's basketball players
Victoria Libertas Pallacanestro players
Virtus Bologna players